Salgaon (also referred to as Salgawan) is a village in the Katkamdag CD block in the Hazaribagh Sadar subdivision of the Hazaribagh district in the Indian state of Jharkhand.

Geography

Location

Gonda Dam
Gonda Dam, an irrigation project, is located near Salgaon. The dam, constructed across the Gonda River, was completed in 1954. It is 1006.09 m long and 13.41 m high.

As per the Wetlands International Asian Waterbirds Census 2016, there were 603 water birds in Gonda Dam.

Demographics
According to the 2011 Census of India, Salgaon had a total population of 3,491, of which 1,796 (51%) were males and 1,695 (49%) were females. Population in the age range 0–6 years was 542. The total number of literate persons in Salgaon was 2,136 (72.43% of the population over 6 years).

Transport
Salagaon and Gonda Dam are off Lepo Road and link roads connect Lepo Road to both Gonda Dam and Salgaon. There also are other roads from Hazaribagh. The Koderma-Hazaribagh-Barkakana railway line, running from Katkamsandi to Hazaribagh in this sector, passes in between the Chharwa Dam and Gonda Dam

References

Villages in Hazaribagh district